Formal public school Education in West Virginia falls under the auspices of the West Virginia Department of Education. Each county in West Virginia constitutes a school district.

Education administration

West Virginia Board of Education
The West Virginia Board of Education is established in the West Virginia Constitution. The Board is vested with general supervision of West Virginia's 834 elementary and secondary schools. Its twelve members include nine citizens appointed by the governor and three non-voting ex-officio members: the State Superintendent of Schools, the Chancellor of the West Virginia Higher Education Policy Commission, and the Chancellor of Community and Technical Education. The State Superintendent is a constitutional officer who serves at the will of the board. Board members serve overlapping terms of nine years, and no more than five citizen members may belong to the same political party.

The West Virginia Board of Education meets monthly to determine the educational policies of the elementary and secondary schools and to establish the rules that carry into effect state law regarding education. The State Board of Education also has general control, supervision, and management of the business and educational affairs of the West Virginia Schools for the Deaf and Blind in Romney.

County Boards of Education
For each K-12 school district there is a board of education with at least five members who are chosen by election in non-partisan races. Though no more than two members may reside in the same magisterial district, members are elected by residents of the entire county. Active teachers and service personnel are not eligible for election to the county Board of Education. Members are elected to four-year terms in which the election occurs during the regular primary election in even years.

In addition to the Boards of Education, each district also has an appointed Superintendent. He typically serves as the executive officer of the county school district and is responsible for enforcing policies of the West Virginia Board of Education. Assignments, transfers, suspensions, and promotions made by the County Superintendent are subject to approval by the county Board of Education. The Superintendent must be a resident of the county in which he serves or in a contiguous West Virginia county.

Each county school district falls within one of eight Regional Education Service Agencies (RESAs).

History
Article X of the 1863 state constitution provided for free and universal system of schools. The 1872 constitution clarified that "White and colored persons shall not be taught in the same school."

In 1990, teachers in 47 of the 55 counties went on strike for eleven days. On February 22, 2018, teachers and support staff in all the state's counties struck the schools over pay and other issues shutting down all the public schools in the state. After nine days, the Legislature granted pay raises.

Comparison 
West Virginia ranks as one of the lowest scoring states for education in the United States. According to The National Assessment of Educational Progress, the state ranks significantly below the national average in mathmatics, reading, writing, and science. This is compared to its surrounding states of Virginia, Maryland, Kentucky, Ohio and Pennsylvania who on average score higher than or equal to the national average.

Schools

Colleges and universities

High schools

See also
List of school districts in West Virginia

References
Education, W. V. (June 10, 2013). Graduation Rates Increasing But West Virginia Still Faces Problem Areas. Retrieved March 4, 2014, from West Virginia Department of Education: http://wvde.state.wv.us/news/2794/

West Virginia Higher Education Policy Commission. (2011). West Virginia College Going Rates By County and High School Fall 2011. Charleston: West Virginia Higher Education Policy Commission.

External links
West Virginia Department of Education
College for West Virginians
WESTEST: West Virginia Educational Standards Test
West Virginia Commission for Professional Teaching Standards
West Virginia Education Information System
List of West Virginia County Board Offices and RESA Offices